Caroline Murphy is a camogie player, winner of All-Ireland Senior medals in 2007 and 2010. She missed the 2011 All Ireland campaign as she was in Canada. She was an All Star nominee in 2007.

Other awards
National League Division one 2009; Club Intermediate 2000; Leinster Senior 2004, 2007; Leinster Junior 2004. Captained the Leinster-winning Wexford Junior football team in 2005, and played in the All Ireland Intermediate final in 2007. Caroline first came to prominence playing hurling at Under-12 and Under-14 level with her home club, St Patrick's (Ballyoughter).

References

External links
 Camogie.ie Official Camogie Association Website

1984 births
Living people
Wexford camogie players